Irving Henry Comp Jr. (May 17, 1919 - July 11, 1989) was an American football player. He played his entire seven-year National Football League (NFL) career with the Green Bay Packers and was inducted into the Green Bay Packers Hall of Fame in 1986.  Comp holds the record for the Packers most interceptions in a season of 10 in 1943.

Born in the Bay View section of Milwaukee, Wisconsin, Comp had sight in only one eye. He attended college and played college football at Benedictine College, then known as St. Benedict's College. He graduated in 1942, and became a member of the Ravens Hall of Fame in 1988. 

Comp was the 23rd overall selection of the 1943 NFL Draft, taken in the third round by the Packers. In his second season in 1944, he led Green Bay to their sixth league title, defeating the New York Giants in the NFL Championship Game. When he retired, he was the alltime leader in interceptions with 34, until he was passed the following year.

References

1919 births
1989 deaths
American football defensive backs
American football quarterbacks
American football running backs
Green Bay Packers players
Benedictine Ravens football players
Players of American football from Milwaukee